Jeffrey Alker Meyer (born April 13, 1963) is a United States district judge of the United States District Court for the District of Connecticut and former Professor of Law at Quinnipiac University School of Law.

Biography

Meyer was born on April 13, 1963, in North Tarrytown, New York. He received a Bachelor of Arts degree, summa cum laude, in 1985, from Yale College. He received a Juris Doctor in 1989 from Yale Law School. From 1989 to 1990, he clerked for Judge James L. Oakes of the United States Court of Appeals for the Second Circuit. From 1991 to 1992, he clerked for Justice Harry A. Blackmun of the United States Supreme Court. Between 1992 and 1995, he worked first at the Washington, D.C. law firm of Shearman & Sterling and then at Kellogg, Huber, Hansen, Todd, Evans & Figel, and then as a staff attorney for Vermont Legal Aid. He served as an Assistant United States Attorney in the District of Connecticut from 1995 to 2004, serving as Appeals Chief from 2000 to 2004. He served as senior counsel to the Independent Inquiry Committee into the United Nations Oil for Food Program in Iraq from 2004 to 2005. Since 2006, he has been a professor of law at Quinnipiac University School of Law and a visiting professor of law at Yale Law School since 2010.

Federal judicial service

On June 7, 2013, President Barack Obama nominated Meyer to serve as a United States District Judge of the United States District Court for the District of Connecticut, to the seat vacated by Judge Mark R. Kravitz, who died on October 1, 2012. He was unanimously rated by the American Bar Association as a "Well Qualified" judicial nominee (ratings are: Well Qualified, Qualified and Not Qualified). His nomination was unanimously  approved by the Senate Judiciary Committee on September 19, 2013. On February 12, 2014, Senate Majority Leader Harry Reid filed for cloture on Meyer's nomination. A cloture vote was scheduled for February 24, 2014. On February 24, 2014 cloture was invoked by a 55–37 vote, with 1 senator voted “present”. His nomination was confirmed later that day by a 91–2 vote. Meyer received his judicial commission on February 25, 2014.

See also 
 List of law clerks of the Supreme Court of the United States (Seat 2)

References

Sources

1963 births
Living people
Assistant United States Attorneys
Connecticut lawyers
Judges of the United States District Court for the District of Connecticut
Law clerks of the Supreme Court of the United States
People from Branford, Connecticut
People from Sleepy Hollow, New York
Quinnipiac University faculty
United States district court judges appointed by Barack Obama
Vermont lawyers
Lawyers from Washington, D.C.
Yale Law School alumni
Yale Law School faculty
21st-century American judges
Yale College alumni